Missenden may refer to:

 Great Missenden, Buckinghamshire, England
 Little Missenden, Buckinghamshire, England
 Great Missenden railway station, Buckinghamshire, England
 Missenden Abbey, Buckinghamshire, England
 Anthony Missenden (1505–1542), British Member of Parliament 
 Eustace Missenden